Jules Sales (born 23 June 1875, date of death unknown) was a Belgian racing cyclist. He won the Belgian national road race title in 1904.

References

External links
 

1875 births
Year of death missing
Belgian male cyclists
Cyclists from Brussels